Burch House may refer to:

John Burch House, part of the Quaker Hill Historic District
Nelson C. and Gertrude A. Burch House, Jefferson City, Missouri
Oscar G. and Mary H. Burch House, Jefferson City, Missouri
Walter Burch House, Hodgenville, Kentucky, listed on the National Register of Historic Places (NRHP)
William Burch House, Fredericktown, Ohio, listed on the NRHP

See also
Birch House (disambiguation)